Phytoecia circumdata is a species of beetle in the family Cerambycidae. It was described by Kraatz in 1882. It is known from Kazakhstan, Uzbekistan, and Iran.

References

Phytoecia
Beetles described in 1882